Luis Muñoz (born 19 March 1947) is a Chilean boxer. He competed in the men's lightweight event at the 1968 Summer Olympics.

References

External links
 

1947 births
Living people
Chilean male boxers
Olympic boxers of Chile
Boxers at the 1968 Summer Olympics
Sportspeople from Santiago
Lightweight boxers
20th-century Chilean people
21st-century Chilean people